Ignorance is the fifth studio album by Canadian band the Weather Station. It was released worldwide on February 5, 2021 through Fat Possum Records in the United States, and a small part (digital or vinyl only) through Next Door Records in Canada. The album's lead single "Robber" was released on October 14, 2020.

The album's ten tracks were recorded with two percussionists, a saxophonist and a flutist, plus bass, keys, and guitar. Songwriter Tamara Lindeman wrote and produced all the songs. The album's theme is based on Lindeman's contemplation of the global climate crisis.

Critical reception

Ignorance was widely acclaimed by music critics. Lindsay Zoladz of The New York Times called it a "piercing new album" and applauded Lindeman's lyrics about climate change.

The album was shortlisted for the 2021 Polaris Music Prize.

Accolades

Track listing

Personnel
Credits adapted from Bandcamp:

Musicians
 Tamara Lindeman – vocals, piano, guitar, Moog, Pianet, Wurlitzer, string arrangements (tracks 1, 3, 4, 6, 7)
 Kieran Adams – drums, percussion
 Christine Bougie – guitar
 Ryan Driver – flute
 Drew Jurecka – violin, clarinet, bass clarinet
 Ian Kehoe – percussion
 Shannon Knights – viola
 Philippe Melanson – percussion
 Lydia Munchinsky – cello
 Owen Pallett – string arrangements (tracks 7, 8)
 Marcus Paquin – percussion
 Mike Smith – music notation
 Johnny Spence – piano, organ, Wurlitzer, Moog, Juno
 Brodie West – saxophone
 Ben Whiteley – bass, guitar
 Felicity Williams – harmony vocals (tracks 3, 9)
 Rebekah Wolkstein – violin

Engineers
 Tamara Lindeman – production, overdubbing
 Marcus Paquin – production, overdubbing, mixing
 Jeremy Darby – engineering
 Julian Decorte – engineering
 Joao Carvalho – final mastering

Design
 Hugo Bernier – design
 Jeff Bierk – photography

Charts

References

2021 albums
The Weather Station albums
Fat Possum Records albums